Katilenge Forest Park is a forest park in the Gambia. It covers 324 hectares. The border with Senegal forms the southern border of the forest area.

It is located at 30 meters above sea level.

References

Forest parks of the Gambia